The Master's Touch is a jazz album by Lester Young.

Track listing 
 "Crazy Over J-Z" (Take 2) Lester Young  -(2:49) 
 "Crazy Over J-Z" (Take 3) Lester Young  -(2:43)
 I Don't Stand a Ghost of a Chance With You [Take 2] Bing Crosby, Ned Washington, Victor Young, Lester Young -(3:22)
 "Ding Dong" (Take 2) Lester Young -(2:27)
 "Ding Dong" (Take 3) Lester Young -(2:28) 
 "Blues 'N' Bells" (Take 2) Lester Young -(2:24) 
 "Blues 'N' Bells" [(Take 3) Lester Young -(2:24) 
 "Back Home Again In Indiana" [Orig. TK2] Ballard MacDonald, James F. Hanley, Lester Young -(2:56)
 "Basie English" Johnny Guarnieri, Lester Young -(3:02)
 "Salute to Fats" (Short Take 2) Johnny Guarnieri, Lester Young -(1:19)
 "Salute to Fats" (Orig. Take 5) Johnny Guarnieri Lester Young -(3:01)
 "Exercise in Swing" Johnny Guarnieri, Lester Young -(3:11) 
 "Exercise in Swing" (Orig. Take 4) Johnny Guarnieri, Lester Young -(3:03) 
 "Circus in Rhythm" (Orig. Take 2) Earle Warren, Lester Young -(3:15) 
 "Tush" (Orig. Take 2) Dicky Wells, Lester Young -(2:55)
 "Circus in Rhythm" (Take 3) Earle Warren, Lester Young -(3:05)
 "Poor Little Plaything" (Take 3)Earle Warren, Lester Young -(2:57) 
 "Exercise in Swing" (Take 2) Johnny Guarnieri, Lester Young -(2:49)
 "Salute to Fats" (Take 4) Johnny Guarnieri, Lester Young -(1:00)
 "Salute to Fats" (Take 3) Johnny Guarnieri, Lester Young –(2:55)

Personnel 
 Lester Young- tenor saxophone
 Harry "Sweets" Edison- trumpet
 Al Killian- trumpet
 Ed Lewis- trumpet
 Joe Newman- trumpet
 Ted Donnelly- trombone
 Eli Robinson- trombone
 Lou Taylor- trombone
 Dickie Wells- trombone
 Jimmy Powell- alto saxophone
 Earl Warren- alto saxophone, voice, arranger
 Buddy Tate- tenor saxophone
 Rudy Rutherford- baritone saxophone 
 Clyde Hart- piano
 Freddie Green- guitar
 Rodney Richardson- bass
 Jo Jones- drums
 Tadd Dameron, Dick Flanagan, Dixky Wells- arrangers

References

Sources 
Gridley, Mark C. Jazz Styles: History & Analysis. 9th N.J.: Prentice Hall, 2006. Print.

Lester Young albums
1993 albums
Savoy Records albums